Raymond Egerton Hubbard, 4th Baron Addington (11 November 1884 – 17 August 1971) was a British Peer. The son of Egerton Hubbard, 2nd Baron Addington, he succeeded the Barony on the death of his elder brother, who had died without a male heir.

He married Margaret Favre MacCallum who died in 1963. However, he died without issue, and the Barony passed to his cousin.

Arms

References

1884 births
1971 deaths
Raymond
Younger sons of barons